Nealsomyia is a genus of flies in the family Tachinidae.

Species
N. chloronitens (Mesnil, 1977)
N. clausa (Curran, 1940)
N. lindneri Mesnil, 1959
N. merzi Cerretti, 2005
N. rufella (Bezzi, 1925)
N. rufipes (Villeneuve, 1937)
N. triseriella (Villeneuve, 1929)

References

Exoristinae
Diptera of Asia
Tachinidae genera